Jonathan Rieckmann (born August 20, 1987) is a Brazilian racewalker. He placed 29th in the men's 50 kilometres walk at the 2016 Summer Olympics.

References

1987 births
Living people
Brazilian male racewalkers
Olympic athletes of Brazil
Athletes (track and field) at the 2016 Summer Olympics